is a 1987 novel by Japanese author Haruki Murakami.
The novel is a nostalgic story of loss and burgeoning sexuality. It is told from the first-person perspective of Toru Watanabe, who looks back on his days as a college student living in Tokyo. Through Watanabe's reminiscences, readers see him develop relationships with two very different women—the beautiful yet emotionally troubled Naoko, and the outgoing, lively Midori.

This novel is set in late 1960s Tokyo during a period when Japanese students, like those of many other nations, were protesting against the established order. While it serves as the backdrop against which the events of the novel unfold, Murakami (through the eyes of Watanabe and Midori) portrays the student movement as largely weak-willed and hypocritical.

Murakami adapted the first section of the novel from an earlier short story, "Firefly". The story was subsequently included in the collection Blind Willow, Sleeping Woman.

Norwegian Wood was hugely popular with Japanese youth and made Murakami something of a superstar in his native country (apparently much to his dismay at the time).

A film adaptation with the same title was released in 2010, directed by Tran Anh Hung.

Title
The original Japanese title, Noruwei no Mori, is the standard Japanese translation of the title of the Beatles song "Norwegian Wood (This Bird Has Flown)". This song is often described in the novel, and is the favorite song of the character Naoko. Mori in the Japanese title translates into English as "wood" in the sense of "forest", not the material "wood", even though the song lyrics refer to the latter. Forest settings and imagery are significant in the novel.

Characters
  — The protagonist and narrator. He is a Tokyo college student of average ability, majoring in drama without reason or conviction for doing so. Unlike most students, he is interested in Western, and in particular, American literature. He was Kizuki's best friend, and develops romantic relationships with Naoko and, later, Midori.
  — A beautiful but emotionally fragile woman who was Kizuki's girlfriend, but becomes involved with Watanabe after Kizuki's death. Naoko's older sister took her own life at age 17, which, along with Kizuki's suicide, has a lasting effect on Naoko's emotional stability and she resides in a psychiatric institution for most of the story.
  — A vivacious, outgoing, and provocative classmate of Watanabe. She and her sister help their absent father run a small bookstore after her mother's death from brain cancer. She originally had a boyfriend but develops feelings for Watanabe as she gets to know him more, putting Watanabe in a tough situation.
  — A patient of the mountain asylum to which Naoko retreats. She and Naoko room together and become close friends. An accomplished pianist and guitarist, Reiko has endured lifelong mental problems that wrecked her professional musical career and later her marriage. She attempts to advise Watanabe and Naoko in their relationship.
  — Watanabe's best friend in high school, and Naoko's first boyfriend. Kizuki took his own life when he was 17, which has a lasting effect on both Watanabe and Naoko.
  — A diplomacy student at the elite University of Tokyo whose friendship with Watanabe is kindled over a shared love of The Great Gatsby. Nagasawa is unusually charismatic and complex in both his ideals and personal relationships. Watanabe routinely accompanies Nagasawa on outings to bars, where they pick up girls for one-night stands. Nagasawa never seems to feel much guilt over these transgressions other than admitting that his girlfriend, Hatsumi, deserves better.
  — The long-suffering girlfriend of Nagasawa. A kind woman by nature, she tries to offer advice to Watanabe, who is reluctant to confide in her or Nagasawa. Two years after Nagasawa leaves for Germany, Hatsumi marries, only to commit suicide after another two years. News of this prompts Watanabe to end his friendship with Nagasawa.
  — Watanabe's dormitory roommate who is obsessed with cleanliness, and who is majoring in cartography in preparation for a career at the Geographical Survey Institute of Japan. His neurotic behavior is a source of annoyance and mockery among the others in the dormitory. He later moves out without warning, leaving their room entirely to Watanabe until he moves out of the dorm altogether.
 Itoh — An art student whom Watanabe meets after moving out of the dorm he shared with Nagasawa and Storm Trooper. The two share a love of Boris Vian. He has a girlfriend in his hometown of Nagasaki, but her unease about Itoh's chosen career leads him to worry about their relationship.
 Momoko "Momo" Kobayashi — Midori's elder sister.
Mr. Kobayashi — Midori's widowed father. Midori had initially said that he had emigrated to Uruguay, but that later turns out to be a joke; Mr. Kobayashi was actually in a hospital in Tokyo, with brain cancer. When Midori and Watanabe visit him, Watanabe briefly stays to take care of him alone. He later dies, and his daughters sell the bookstore to move elsewhere.

Plot synopsis
37-year-old Toru Watanabe is landing in Hamburg, West Germany, when he hears an orchestral cover of the Beatles' song "Norwegian Wood". He is suddenly overwhelmed by feelings of loss and nostalgia. He thinks back to the 1960s, when so much happened that touched his life.

Watanabe, his classmate Kizuki, and Kizuki's girlfriend Naoko are the best of friends. Kizuki and Naoko are particularly close and feel as if they are soulmates, and Watanabe seems more than happy to be their enforcer. This idyllic existence is shattered by the unexpected suicide of Kizuki on his 17th birthday. Kizuki's death deeply touches both surviving friends; Watanabe feels the influence of death everywhere, while Naoko feels as if some integral part of her has been permanently lost. The two of them spend more and more time together going for long walks on Sundays, although feelings for each other are never clarified in this interval. On the night of Naoko's 20th birthday, she feels especially vulnerable and they have sex, during which Watanabe realizes that she is a virgin. Afterward, Naoko leaves Watanabe a letter saying that she needs some time apart and is quitting college to go to a sanatorium.

These events are set against a backdrop of civil unrest. The students at Watanabe's college go on strike and call for a revolution. Inexplicably, the students end their strike and act as if nothing had happened, which enrages Watanabe as a sign of hypocrisy.

Watanabe is befriended by a fellow drama classmate, Midori Kobayashi. She is everything that Naoko is not — outgoing, vivacious, and supremely self-confident. Despite his love for Naoko, Watanabe finds himself attracted to Midori as well. Midori reciprocates his feelings, and their friendship grows during Naoko's absence. Watanabe and Midori share a special kind of relationship where both of them understand each other. 

Watanabe visits Naoko at her secluded mountain sanatorium near Kyoto. There he meets Reiko Ishida, an older patient there who has become Naoko's confidante. During this and subsequent visits, Reiko and Naoko reveal more about their past: Reiko talks about the cause of her collapse into mental illness and details the failure of her marriage, while Naoko talks about the unexpected suicide of her older sister several years ago.

When he returns to Tokyo, Watanabe is distracted by his continuing thoughts about Naoko, and unintentionally alienates Midori by moving to a suburb without telling her. He writes a letter to Reiko, asking for her advice about his conflicted affections for both Naoko and Midori. He does not want to hurt Naoko, but he does not want to lose Midori either. Reiko counsels him to seize this chance for happiness and see how his relationship with Midori turns out.

A later letter informs Watanabe that Naoko has killed herself. Watanabe, grieving and in a daze, wanders aimlessly around Japan, while Midori—with whom he hasn't kept in touch—wonders what has happened to him. After about a month of wandering, he returns to the Tokyo area and gets in contact with Reiko, who leaves the sanatorium to come to visit. Reiko stays with Watanabe, and they have sex. It is through this experience and the intimate conversation that Watanabe and Reiko share that night, that he comes to realize that Midori is the most important person in his life. After he sees Reiko off, Watanabe calls Midori to declare his love for her. Midori asks, "Where are you now?", and the novel ends with Watanabe pondering that question.

English translations
Norwegian Wood has been translated into English twice. The first translation was by Alfred Birnbaum, who translated several of Murakami's earlier novels, and was published, in Japan only, in 1989 by Kodansha as part of the Kodansha English Library series. Like other books in this pocket-sized series, the English text was intended for Japanese students of English, and the book featured an appendix listing the Japanese text for key English phrases encountered in the novel. This edition kept the two-volume division of the original Japanese version and its color scheme, the first volume having a red cover, the second green (the first UK edition in 2000 also kept this division and appearance). This earlier translation has been discontinued in Japan.

The second translation, by Jay Rubin, is the authorized version for publication outside Japan and was first published in 2000 by Harvill Press in the UK, and Vintage International in the United States.

The two translations differ somewhat. There are differences in nicknames: Watanabe's roommate, for example, is called "Kamikaze" in the Birnbaum translation, and "Storm Trooper" in the Rubin translation.

No English trade hardcover edition of the novel was published until October 2010, when an exclusive limited edition for Waterstone's was released by Vintage Classics.

Film adaptation

A film adaptation directed by Tran Anh Hung was released in Japan in 2010. The film stars Kenichi Matsuyama as Watanabe, Rinko Kikuchi as Naoko, and Kiko Mizuhara as Midori. It was presented at the 67th Venice International Film Festival. Jonny Greenwood wrote the score for the film.

Locations used in the film include the Tonomine highlands, Mineyama highlands and Kasumi coast.

References

External links
Norwegian Wood by Haruki Murakami, Reviewed by Ted Gioia

1987 Japanese novels
Japanese novels adapted into films
Japanese romance novels
Novels by Haruki Murakami
Books about depression
Novels about mental health
Novels set in Tokyo
Fiction set in the 1960s
Novels about music
Fiction about suicide
Kodansha books